The Twelfth Night Revelers, founded in 1870, is a New Orleans, Louisiana, Carnival Krewe. It is the second oldest continuous organization of New Orleans Carnival festivities.

History and Formation
In 1870 Sidney Smith, the son of a Striker from Mobile,Alabama, organized the Twelfth Night Revelers in New Orleans, nearly 30 years after the Strikers Independent Society was formed in Mobile, Alabama, and 13 years after the Mistick Krewe in 1857.

Carnival Traditions
From its inauguration in 1870, the Twelfth Night Revelers introduced the Twelfth Night or King Cake cut by the leader, the Lord of Misrule. Also that year the Grand March, the first of the new wrinkles planned by the new krewe (and copied by almost all krewes that followed). In 1871 a Santa Claus masker appeared in a street pageant, and distributed favors to the crowd, inaugurating the practice of throwing trinkets from parades, or throws. Also that year a Queen was chosen and with her a royal court of young ladies were presented as debutants. The introduction of political satire with its 1873 parade, titled "The World of Audubon."

Theme

Gallery

See Also
Knights of Momus
Louisiana Club
Mistick Krewe
Knights of Chaos

References 

Mardi Gras in New Orleans